In physics and mathematics, the Pauli group  on 1 qubit is the 16-element matrix group consisting of the 2 × 2 identity matrix  and all of the Pauli matrices
,
together with the products of these matrices with the factors  and :
.
The Pauli group is generated by the Pauli matrices, and like them it is named after Wolfgang Pauli.

The Pauli group on  qubits, is the group generated by the operators described above applied to each of  qubits in the tensor product Hilbert space .

As an abstract group,  is the central product of a cyclic group of order 4 and the dihedral group of order 8.

The Pauli group is a representation of the gamma group in three-dimensional Euclidean space. It is not isomorphic to the gamma group; it is less free, in that its chiral element is  whereas there is no such relationship for the gamma group.

References

External links

Finite groups
Quantum information science

2. https://arxiv.org/abs/quant-ph/9807006